The 2019–20 Penn State Lady Lions basketball team represented Pennsylvania State University during the 2019–20 NCAA Division I women's basketball season. The Lady Lions, led by first-year head coach Carolyn Kieger, played their home games at the Bryce Jordan Center as members of the Big Ten Conference.

They finished the season with a record of 7–23, 1–17 in Big Ten play to finish in fourteenth place. They lost in the first round of the Big Ten women's tournament to Minnesota.

Previous season
The Lady Lions finished the season with a record of 12–18, 5–13 in Big Ten play to finish in twelfth place. They lost in the first round of the Big Ten women's tournament to Wisconsin.

After the season, Coquese Washington was fired as head coach. She finished at Penn State with a twelve-year record of 209–169.

Roster

Schedule and results

Source:

|-
!colspan=9 style=| Exhibition

|-
!colspan=9 style=| Non-conference regular season

|-
!colspan=9 style=| Big Ten conference season

|-
!colspan=9 style=| Big Ten Women's Tournament

Rankings

See also
 2019–20 Penn State Nittany Lions basketball team

References

Penn State Lady Lions basketball seasons
Penn State
Penn State
Penn State